Rear admiral Derek Willoughby Bazalgette CB (22 July 1924 – 22 July 2007) was a Royal Navy officer who became President of the Royal Naval College, Greenwich.

Naval career
Educated at the Royal Naval College, Dartmouth, Bazalgette joined the Royal Navy in 1938 and served in World War II with the Arctic convoys. While serving as Second-in-Command of the aircraft carrier HMS Centaur in 1964, he assisted in an operation to deploy 45 Commando in Dar es Salaam where the 1st Battalion Tanganyika Rifles had staged a mutiny. He became Director of Naval Operations at the Ministry of Defence in 1965, Commanding Officer of the frigate HMS Aurora in 1967 and Chief of Staff to the Commander British Forces in Hong Kong in 1970. He went on to be Commanding Officer of the commando carrier HMS Bulwark in 1972 and President of the Royal Naval College, Greenwich in 1974 before retiring in 1976. He died in July 2007.

References

1924 births
2007 deaths
Royal Navy rear admirals
Companions of the Order of the Bath
Admiral presidents of the Royal Naval College, Greenwich